Lan Wei (born 7 May 1968) is a Chinese former diver who competed in the 1992 Summer Olympics.

References

External links

1968 births
Living people
Sportspeople from Guangzhou
Chinese male divers
Olympic divers of China
Divers at the 1992 Summer Olympics
Universiade medalists in diving
Universiade gold medalists for China
World Aquatics Championships medalists in diving
20th-century Chinese people
21st-century Chinese people